Alfonso Carvajal may refer to:

 Alfonso Carvajal (actor), Filipino actor
 Alfonso Carvajal (writer) (born 1958), Colombian writer and editor